Beuna is a village and a former municipality in the Saalekreis district, in Saxony-Anhalt, Germany. Since 1 January 2009, it is part of the town Merseburg.

References

Former municipalities in Saxony-Anhalt
Merseburg